The Truth About Men is a 1926 American silent drama film directed by Elmer Clifton and starring Edna Murphy, George Hackathorne and Alice Lake.

Cast
 Edna Murphy as Elsa
 George Hackathorne as	James
 Alice Lake as	Dora

References

Bibliography
 Connelly, Robert B. The Silents: Silent Feature Films, 1910-36, Volume 40, Issue 2. December Press, 1998.
 Munden, Kenneth White. The American Film Institute Catalog of Motion Pictures Produced in the United States, Part 1. University of California Press, 1997.

External links
 

1926 films
1926 drama films
American silent feature films
Silent American drama films
American black-and-white films
Films directed by Elmer Clifton
1920s American films
1920s English-language films